Bangladesh Navy School and College, Khulna is an academic institute run by Bangladesh Navy located at Goalkhali, Khalishpur, GPO - 9000, Khulna. Its institutional code (EIIN) is 117112.

History 
It was established in 1979 as a school, and the college section was started in 2003.

Academic activities 
The institute has the following three disciplines for secondary and higher secondary sections - Science, Business Studies and Humanities. Its public examinations are conducted under the Board of Intermediate and Secondary Education, Jessore. Students from a service background and meritorious civil students can both study here.

Student activities 
Besides academics, students of BN School & College, Khulna get involved in different extracurricular activities such as sports, culture, literature, debate, art, social welfare activities, and other creative arenas. They also take part in Sea Rover Scouting and BNCC (Naval Wing).

See also 
 School and Colleges of Bangladesh Navy
 Bangladesh Navy College, Dhaka
 Bangladesh Navy School and College, Chittagong

References 

Bangladesh Navy
Educational Institutions in Bangladesh
High schools in Bangladesh
Colleges in Bangladesh
Colleges in Khulna District
Educational institutions established in 1979